Han Gang (born 10 November 1978) is a Chinese long-distance runner. He competed in the men's marathon at the 2004 Summer Olympics.

References

1978 births
Living people
People from Bayannur
Runners from Inner Mongolia
Chinese male long-distance runners
Chinese male cross country runners
Chinese male marathon runners
Olympic male marathon runners
Olympic athletes of China
Athletes (track and field) at the 2004 Summer Olympics
Asian Cross Country Championships winners